Galicia '93 Pescanova is a Volvo Ocean 60 yacht. She finished third in the W60 class of the 1993–94 Whitbread Round the World Race skippered by Javier Gandara.

References

Volvo Ocean Race yachts
Sailing yachts of Spain
Volvo Ocean 60 yachts
Fastnet Race yachts
1990s sailing yachts